Where the Boys Are is a 1960 American CinemaScope comedy film directed by Henry Levin and starring Connie Francis, Dolores Hart, Paula Prentiss, George Hamilton, Yvette Mimieux, Jim Hutton, and Frank Gorshin. It was written by George Wells based on the 1960 novel of the same name by Glendon Swarthout. The screenplay concerns four college co-eds who spend spring break in Fort Lauderdale. The title song "Where the Boys Are" was sung by Connie Francis, who also co-starred in a supporting role.

Where the Boys Are was one of the first teen films to explore adolescent sexuality and the changing sexual morals and attitudes among American college youth. Aimed at the teen market, it inspired many American college students to head to Fort Lauderdale for their annual spring break. It won Laurel Awards for Best Comedy of the Year and Best Comedy Actress (Paula Prentiss).

Plot
The film mainly focuses on the "coming of age" of four girl students at a midwestern university during spring vacation. In a class discussion, smart, down-to-earth Merritt Andrews suggests that premarital sex might be something young women should experience. Melanie Tolman, a magnet for young men, loses her virginity on her first date, soon after the young women arrive in Fort Lauderdale, Florida. Tuggle Carpenter  seeks to be a "baby-making machine", lacking only a man to join her in marriage. The athletic Angie, who is clueless about romance, rounds out the group.

The girls find their attitudes challenged. Merritt, a freshman, meets suave, darkly handsome Ryder Smith, a senior at Brown University, and realizes she is not ready for sex. Melanie discovers that Franklin, a boy from Yale University whom she thought loved her, was only using her for sex. Tuggle quickly fixes her attention on goofy "TV" Thompson, a junior at Michigan State University, but becomes disillusioned when he becomes infatuated with performer Lola Fandango, a "mermaid" swimmer/dancer in a local nightclub. Angie stumbles into a relationship with eccentric jazz musician Basil.

The relationship angst of Merritt, Tuggle, and Angie evaporates when they discover Melanie is distraught after going to meet Franklin at a motel and instead finding there another of the "Yalies", Dill, who raped her. Franklin had moved on to another girl, but told Dill that Melanie was "easy" and set up the ambush. Melanie, her dress torn, walks into traffic. Just as her friends arrive, she is sideswiped by a car and is rushed to the hospital.

Ultimately, the girls resolve to act more maturely and responsibly. After hearing about Melanie, "TV" returns to Tuggle. Angie ends up with Basil, especially after he loses his glasses and needs her help. Melanie recovers in the hospital, with Merritt looking after her. Merritt promises Ryder she will continue their long-distance relationship. He then drives them back to college.

Cast
 Dolores Hart as Merritt Andrews
 Paula Prentiss as Tuggle Carpenter
 Yvette Mimieux as Melanie Tolman
 Connie Francis as Angie
 George Hamilton as Ryder Smith
 Jim Hutton as TV Thompson
 Rory Harrity as Franklin
 Frank Gorshin as Basil
 Chill Wills as Police Captain
 Barbara Nichols as Lola Fandango
 Maggie Pierce as Dody
 Carol Byron as Sybil

Production
Joe Pasternak bought the film rights to the novel, which originally was known as Unholy Spring, even before it was published. He assigned George Wells to write the script.

"There isn't a gat, knife, or marijuana cigarette in the whole thing", said Pasternak. "These are good students. We'll use our young contract players, such as George Hamilton, Joe Cronin, Denny Miller, Alfredo Sadel, Bill Smith, Russ Tamblyn, Luana Patten, Maggie Pierce, Carmen Phillips, and Nancy Walters; then get one star to head the cast." Natalie Wood, who had just made All the Fine Young Cannibals for MGM, was mentioned as a possible star at one stage.

MGM eventually persuaded the book's author to change the title from Unholy Spring to Where the Boys Are.

Henry Levin was signed to direct. The first two stars confirmed for the movie were George Hamilton and Yvette Mimieux. Paula Prentiss was cast despite never having made a movie before. Connie Francis also made her movie debut (although she had previously done voice work in Jamboree! and Rock Rock Rock!) . Strangely enough, this marked the first of three films starring Francis which featured "boys" in the title. The other two were Follow The Boys and When The Boys Meet The Girls. Coincidentally, Hamilton, Prentiss and star Dolores Hart were all born the same year, and 22 at the time of filming. The youngest of the principal cast was Yvette Mimieux, who was only 19 years old during filming.

The novel contained a section where the students help raise money to ship arms to Fidel Castro for his revolution in Cuba. Pasternak decided to remove this. "The author was very sympathetic to Castro", said Pasternak. "Politics does not belong in entertainment. As actors or writers or movie makers of any sort, we have a right to our political preferences. But that is why we have secret ballots... We felt that the only revolution these youngsters should be involved in was their personal revolution."

George Hamilton got a bit part for his friend Sean Flynn in the movie.

Hamilton claims to have improvised the scene in which he wrote a question mark in the sand next to Dolores Hart. He firmly believed he was making a "little nothing of a film" and did not enjoy the shoot. The film also featured the screen debut, in an unaccredited role, by former Miss Ohio and Elvis Presley consort Kathy Gabriel.

The opening sequence was narrated by veteran voice-over artist Paul Frees. Frees is best known for his work on Disneyland attractions, such as The Haunted Mansion and Pirates Of The Caribbean.

Music
The kind of cool modern jazz (or west coast jazz) popularized by such acts as Dave Brubeck, Gerry Mulligan, and Chico Hamilton, then in the vanguard of the college music market, features in a number of scenes with Basil. Called "dialectic jazz" in the film, the original compositions were by Pete Rugolo.

MGM had bolstered the film's success potential by giving a large role to Connie Francis, the top American female recording star and a member of the MGM Records roster. Francis had solicited the services of Neil Sedaka and Howard Greenfield, who had written hit songs for her, to write original material for her to perform on the film's soundtrack including a "Where the Boys Are" title song. Sedaka and Greenfield wrote two potential title songs for the film, but producer Joe Pasternak passed over the song Francis and the songwriting duo preferred in favor of a lush 1950s style movie theme. Francis recorded the song on October 18, 1960 in a New York City recording session with Stan Applebaum arranging and conducting.

The theme song, "Where the Boys Are", peaked at No. 4 in the U.S. and became Connie Francis's signature tune. It was covered by many other artists.

Besides the theme song, Francis sang "Turn on the Sunshine", another Sedaka-Greenfield composition, in the film.

The film's soundtrack also features "Have You Met Miss Fandango?", sung by co-star Barbara Nichols and featured music by Victor Young and lyrics by Stella Unger.

MGM did not release a soundtrack album for Where the Boys Are.

Reception
The film was a success at the box office.

MGM signed Henry Levin, Dolores Hart, Prentiss and Hutton to long-term contracts.

Critical
American humanities professor Camille Paglia has praised Where the Boys Are for its accurate depiction of courtship and sexuality, illustrating once-common wisdom that she contends has been obscured by second-wave feminism:

Accolades
The film is recognized by American Film Institute in these lists:
 2004: AFI's 100 Years...100 Songs:	
 "Where the Boys Are" – Nominated

Proposed sequel
In 1960, it was announced Pasternak would make a follow up titled Where the Girls Are, starring George Hamilton. It was meant to be an entirely different story rather than a sequel. But this was never produced.

Pasternak also announced plans to reunite Hamilton, Prentiss, Hutton and Mimieux in a romantic comedy titled Only a Paper Moon from a story by George Bradshaw, "Image of a Starlet". This became A Ticklish Affair, and was made, but without any of those actors.

Nonetheless there were a number of unofficial follow-ups. MGM liked Paula Prentiss and Jim Hutton as a team so much they put them together in three more movies: Bachelor in Paradise, The Honeymoon Machine and The Horizontal Lieutenant. MGM also made a number of other romantic comedies in the style of Where the Boys Are, including Come Fly with Me and Follow the Boys.

It also inspired a number of imitations from other studios, including the Beach Party series and Palm Springs Weekend.

1984 film
Where the Boys Are '84 was released in 1984 by TriStar Pictures. While it bears the distinction of being the first film released by TriStar, the film was a critical and commercial failure. Although it was touted as a remake, Roger Ebert reported that "It isn't a sequel and isn't a remake and isn't, in fact, much of anything."

References

External links

 
 
 
 

1960 films
1960 comedy-drama films
1960s sex comedy films
1960s teen films
American comedy-drama films
American coming-of-age films
American sex comedy films
American teen films
1960s English-language films
Films about spring break
Films based on American novels
Films directed by Henry Levin
Films produced by Joe Pasternak
Films set in Fort Lauderdale, Florida
Films with screenplays by George Wells
Juvenile sexuality in films
Metro-Goldwyn-Mayer films
1960s American films